Český Krumlov (or Böhmisch Krumau) is a town in the South Bohemian Region of the Czech Republic. It has about 12,000 inhabitants. It is known as a tourist centre, which is among the most visited places in the country. The historic centre with the Český Krumlov Castle complex is protected by law as an urban monument reservation, and since 1992, it has been a designated UNESCO World Heritage Site because of its well-preserved Gothic, Renaissance and Baroque architecture.

Administrative parts
Český Krumlov is made up of town parts of Domoradice, Horní Brána, Latrán, Nádražní Předměstí, Plešivec and Vnitřní Město, and villages of Nové Dobrkovice, Nové Spolí, Slupenec and Vyšný.

Etymology
Krumlov has its origin in Middle High German Krumme Aue, which can be translated as crooked meadow, after a bend of the Vltava river. The adjective Český ("Bohemian") was added in the 15th century to differentiate it from Moravský Krumlov in south Moravia.

Geography
It is situated on both banks of the Vltava river. It lies in the Bohemian Forest Foothills. The northern part of the territory belongs to the Blanský les Protected Landscape Area.

History

Thanks to the convenient location by the river, the area has been permanently inhabited. The area's oldest settlement goes back to the Older Stone Age (70,000–50,000 BC), the mass settlement is proven in the Bronze Age (1,500 BC). Celtic settlements were here in the Younger Iron Age (c. 400 BC), and the first Slavic settlement from the 6th century AD. In the Early Middle Ages, trade routes led through this territory along the Vltava.

The Český Krumlov Castle was founded shortly before 1250 by a local branch of the noble Vítkovci family, descendants of Witiko of Prčice. The first written mention of Český Krumlov was in a 1253 deed as Chrumbenowe. The town was established in two stages. The first part called Latrán was built spontaneously below the castle, settled mostly by people who had some administrative connection with the castle. The second part was subsequently founded as a brand new settlement and called Old Town. Since the foundation of the town, both Czech and German nationalities were represented. A Jewish community is documented since 1334.

In 1302 the Vítkovci line became extinct and King Wenceslaus II, who acquired the estate and castle by escheat, ceded it to the Rosenberg family, who later made it the main residence of their family. Peter I of Rosenberg, the Lord Chamberlain of King John of Bohemia, had the present upper castle erected in the early 14th century. Under his rule the Rosenberg estates flourished. Český Krumlov achieved the highest prosperity in the 15th century during the rule of Oldřich II of Rosenberg, when the estate territory was considerably enlarged.

The Rosenbergs strongly promoted trade and crafts within the town walls. In the late 15th century, when gold was found next to the town, German miners came to settle, which shifted the ethnic balance even more. In one of the churches, the sermons were preached in Czech until the 1780s, when Church of Saint Judoc was closed. In 1555, William of Rosenberg joined the town parts of Latrán and Old Town, which had been up to then separate, and unified the town. In the late 16th century, he had the castle rebuilt in the Renaissance style.

In 1602, William's brother Peter Vok of Rosenberg sold Krumlov to Emperor Rudolf II, who gave it to his illegitimate son Julius d'Austria. After the Bohemian Revolt and the 1620 Battle of White Mountain, Emperor Ferdinand II gave Krumlov to the noble House of Eggenberg and the town became seat of the Duchy of Krumlov. From 1719 to 1947, the castle belonged to the House of Schwarzenberg.

In the 19th century, the industrialization and development of transport occurred, and most of the town fortifications was demolished.

There were 8,662 inhabitants in Krumlov in 1910, of which 7,367 (85%) were Germans and 1,295 (15%) were Czechs. After World War I, Český Krumlov was a part of the Bohemian Forest Region in a newly-created Czechoslovakia, but German-Austrian deputies declared the region be part of German-Austria. In 1919, the Treaty of Saint-Germain-en-Laye recognized the area as part of Czechoslovakia. In 1938, it was annexed by Nazi Germany, as part of the Reichsgau Oberdonau unit of Sudetenland, under the Munich Agreement. After World War II, the town's longtime German population was expelled and the town was returned to Czechoslovakia.

During the Communist era of Czechoslovakia, the historic Český Krumlov fell into disrepair. However, since the Velvet Revolution of 1989 much of the town's sights has been restored, and it is now a popular tourist destination.

In August 2002, Český Krumlov was damaged by 2002 European floods.

Demographics

Economy

There are several notable industrial companies. The largest of them are Linde Pohony (producer of propulsion and control systems for forklifts, part of Linde Material Handlings group) and two divisions of Schwan-Stabilo corporate group, Schwan Cosmetics (producer of cosmetic pencils) and Schwan-Stabilo (producer of writing instruments). The largest non-industrial employer is the Český Krumlov Hospital.

From 1560, Český Krumlov was also home to the Pivovar Eggenberg brewery. In 2014, the brewery was closed and since 2016, a new small historical brewery has been operating in the premises of the former brewery.

Transport
Český Krumlov has a railway station served by GW Train Regio and České dráhy situated on the České Budějovice–Nové Údolí (Stožec municipality) line. There has been a direct train to Prague since 2016. Several bus companies operate direct bus services to Prague. There are also direct shuttle minibus services to several cities including Prague, Munich and Vienna.

Culture
Český Krumlov hosts a number of festivals and other events each year including the Five-Petalled Rose Festival (a reference to the rose of the Rosenberg crest), which is held on the summer solstice weekend. The downtown area is turned into a medieval town with craftsmen, artists, musicians, and local people in medieval costume. Activities include jousting, fencing, historical dance performances, and folk theatre, in the castle precincts and along the river. It concludes with a fireworks display.

The International Music Festival Český Krumlov begins in July and ends in August, and features international music of various genres. Other such events are held throughout the year. The summer music festivals include the blues, rock, and soul festival Open Air Krumlov, held in late June at Eggenberg Brewery Garden.

Sights

The historic town centre with the castle complex has been a designated UNESCO World Heritage Site since 1992, one of the first in the country. The town preserves the street layout from the Middle Ages. Most of the architecture of the old town and castle dates from the 14th through 17th centuries; the town's structures are mostly in Gothic, Renaissance, and Baroque styles. The historical core, today Vnitřní město ("Inner Town") town part, is within a horseshoe meander of the river, with the old Latrán town part and castle complex on the other side of the Vltava.

The centre of Old Town is formed by Svornosti Square. Its main landmark is the town hall from 1597. It was created by merger of three Gothic houses with arcades, whose façade was merged with a Renaissance attic.

The town has preserved only few fragments of the town fortifications, formed by one town gate from 1598–1602, a bastion from 1505, and remains of zwinger walls.

Castle

It is formed by forty buildings and palaces, situated around five castle courts and a castle park.

It is relatively unique in that it is surrounded by a moat filled not with water, but with bears. This was an attempt by the erstwhile rulers of the castle to associate themselves with the powerful Orsini family – whose name is a pun on the Italian word for bear; orso.

Castle theatre
Český Krumlov Castle preserves its Baroque theatre, built in 1680–82 under Prince Johann Christian I von Eggenberg and renovated with up-to-date stage equipment under Joseph I Adam of Schwarzenberg from 1765 to 1766. It is one of few such court theatres to retain its original stage machinery, scenery and props. Due to its age, the theatre is only used three times a year (only twice open to the public), when a Baroque opera is performed in simulated candlelight. Since 1959, the revolving auditorium is located in the gardens.

Ecclesial buildings
The most valuable church and a national cultural heritage is the Church of Saint Vitus. It is a late Gothic structure from 1407–1439 with later modifications, built on the foundations of an older church from 1309. It is accessible to the public and still serves to religious and cultural purposes.

The former Church of Saint Judoc in Latrán was abolished in 1787 or 1788. Today it is used for housing and shopping purposes. The tower is accessible and serves as a lookout tower.

The Church of the Corpus Cristi and the Virgin Mary is located in complex of three monasteries in Latrán. The complex was opened in 2015 after extensive reconstruction. It includes former monasteries of Friars Minor, Poor Clares, and 
Beguines.

The Český Krumlov Synagogue is an Art Nouveau building with Neo-Romanesque features. It was built in 1908 and abolished in 1938. Today it serves to cultural purposes.

Museums
Český Krumlov has a museum and gallery dedicated to the painter Egon Schiele, who lived in the town, the Egon Schiele Art Centrum. In the town centre there is a museum dedicated to the semi-precious gemstone moldavite.

Other museums include Castle Museum with the Castle Tower, Regional Museum in Český Krumlov, Museum of Marionettes, Wax Figures Museum, Museums of Torture Law, Český Krumlov Monasteries Museum, Museum Fotoateliér Seidel (a museum of photography), or Museum of Historical Motorcycles.

In popular culture
Český Krumlov has been used for locations in movies and TV series such as The Adventures of Pinocchio (1996), The Scarlet Pimpernel (1999), Hostel (2005), and The Illusionist (2006).

Notable people

House of Rosenberg (between c. 1250 and 1602)
House of Eggenberg (between 1622 and 1717)
Anton Hickel (1745–1798), painter
Egon Schiele (1890–1918), painter, lived here
Karel Šmirous (1890–1981), scientist
Petr Eben (1929–2007), composer
Anna Chromý (1940–2021), painter and sculptor
Dana Kuchtová (born 1961), politician
Luděk Sekyra (born 1964), businessman
Petr Muk (1965–2010), pop singer
Tomáš Kobes (born 1978), slalom canoeist
Jan Matura (born 1980), ski jumper

International relations

Twin towns – sister cities
Český Krumlov is twinned with:
 Hauzenberg, Germany
 Kalush, Ukraine
 Llanwrtyd Wells, Wales, United Kingdom
 Miami Beach, United States
 San Gimignano, Italy
 Slovenj Gradec, Slovenia
 Vöcklabruck, Austria

Friendly towns and cities
Český Krumlov has friendly relations with:
 Cusco, Peru
 Dubrovnik, Croatia
 Kuressaare, Estonia
 Linz, Austria

Gallery

References

External links

 
Official information portal
Tourist portal
International Music Festival Český Krumlov
Český Krumlov and its monuments

 
Populated places in Český Krumlov District
Cities and towns in the Czech Republic
World Heritage Sites in the Czech Republic